Wolkoff is a surname. Notable people with the surname include:
Alexander Wolkoff (1844-1928, signed as A. N. Roussoff), Russian botanist and painter; see also Palazzo Barbaro Wolkoff.    
Anna Wolkoff (1902-1973), Russian-born Britain's administrator
Norma Lerner (born 1935/36 as Norma Wolkoff), American billionaire 
Stephanie Winston Wolkoff, American fashion and entertainment executive, senior advisor to Melania Trump